Left & Right is an album by the jazz multi-instrumentalist Roland Kirk, released on the Atlantic label in 1968. It contains performances by Kirk with Jim Buffington, Julius Watkins, Frank Wess, Rahn Burton, Vernon Martin and Roy Haynes, with Warren Smith, Richard Williams, Dick Griffin, Benny Powell, Pepper Adams, Alice Coltrane, Jimmy Hopps, Daniel Jones and Gerald "Sonny" Brown featuring on an extended track with orchestration by Gil Fuller.

Critical reception
The AllMusic review by Thom Jurek states: "The title of this album, Left and Right, no doubt refers to the sides of Rahsaan Roland Kirk's brain, which were both heavily taxed in the composing, arranging, conducting, and playing of this recording... This is an extreme for Rahsaan — extremely brilliant and thoroughly accessible".

Track listing
All compositions by Roland Kirk except as indicated.
 "Black Mystery Has Been Revealed" - 1:17  
 "Expansions: Kirkquest/Kingus Mingus/Celestialness/A Dream of Beauty Reincarnated/Frisco Vibrations/Classical Jazzical/El  Kirk" - 19:37
 "Lady's Blues" - 3:46  
 "IX Love" (Charles Mingus) - 3:40  
 "Hot Cha" (Willie Woods) - 3:23  
 "Quintessence" (Quincy Jones) - 4:11  
 "I Waited for You" (Gil Fuller, Dizzy Gillespie) - 2:54  
 "A Flower is a Lovesome Thing" (Billy Strayhorn) - 3:55  
Recorded in NYC on June 17 & 18, 1968

Personnel
Roland Kirk: tenor saxophone, manzello, stritch, clarinet, flute, organ, narration, thumb piano, celesta
Jim Buffington, Julius Watkins: french horn
Frank Wess: woodwinds
Richard Williams: trumpet (track 2) 
Dick Griffith, Benny Powell: trombone (track 2) 
Daniel Jones: bassoon (track 2) 
Pepper Adams: baritone saxophone (track 2) 
Alice Coltrane: harp (track 2) 
Ron Burton: piano
Vernon Martin: bass
Roy Haynes: drums
Jimmy Hopps: drums (track 2)
Warren Smith: percussion, vocals
Gerald "Sonny" Brown: percussion (track 2)
Gil Fuller: arranger
Unidentified strings

References

1968 albums
Atlantic Records albums
Rahsaan Roland Kirk albums
Albums produced by Joel Dorn
Albums arranged by Gil Fuller